The T'ai chi Classics, or Taijiquan Classics (Chinese: Taijiquan Pu 太极拳谱 or Taijiquan Jing 太極拳經), is a collection of over 100 articles on the Chinese martial art of t'ai chi ch'uan written by the art's master practitioners over the centuries.  They cover everything from the underlying Taiji philosophical principles, to methods of practice and application.  Previously passed down in secret from generation to generation in whole or in parts through various lineages, they achieved classical status as they became public starting in the mid-1930s.  Together they now serve as the single authoritative guide for the development and usage of Taijiquan skills. Written mostly in classical Chinese, they are used today mostly by the serious martial art practitioners of modern 6 Lineages that all trace their lineages to the ancient style taught by the Chen family and Yang family starting in the mid-19th century.

While great antiquity is usually claimed for texts by legendary authors, modern scholarship has not been able to date any of them earlier than the late 19th century.

Writings accorded Classic status
T'ai Chi Ch'uan Classic attributed to the legendary founder of t'ai chi ch'uan, Zhang Sanfeng, claimed to be ca. 12th-14th century.
Salt Shop Manual containing the T'ai Chi Ch'uan Treatise attributed to the legendary Wang Tsung-yueh (Wang Zongyue). The text was said to have been found stored in the back room of a Beijing salt shop by Wu Yu-hsiang's brother Wu Ch'eng-ch'ing.
Miscellaneous texts: Song of Thirteen Postures, Mental Elucidation of the Practise of T'ai Chi Ch'uan and the Song of Sparring handed down in the Yang and Wu families. 
Texts by Wu Yu-hsiang (1812–1880), a central figure in Wu (Hao)-style t'ai chi ch'uan, and his nephew Li I-yü (1832–1892).
Forty Chapters of writings, with the last three chapters directly attributed to Chang San-feng, preserved in the Yang and Wu Chien-ch'uan families.
T'ai Chi Ch'uan Illustrated published in 1919 by Ch'en Hsin (1849–1929) an important Chen family scholar.
The Study of T'ai Chi Ch'uan first published in 1924 by Sun Lu-t'ang, the founder of the fifth classical style of t'ai chi ch'uan.
Yang Chengfu (1883-1936) published his Complete Principles and Applications of T'ai Chi Ch'uan in 1934, a work considered authoritative in schools influenced by his many students and progeny. The book includes the well known "Ten Essential Points of Taijiquan Theory" authored by Ch'eng-fu.
Wu Kung-tsao (Wu Gongzao; 1902–1983) provided original texts and commentary on the previously mentioned Forty Chapters in Wu Family T'ai Chi Ch'uan. Wu's grandfather Wu Ch'uan-yu (Wu Quanyou) had inherited the Forty Chapters from Yang Pan-hou. The book was first published in Changsha in 1935. In 1980, when the book was published again in Hong Kong, the famous wuxia author Jin Yong contributed a postscript to Wu Kung-tsao's text in which Jin described influences from as far back as Lao Tzu and Chuang Tzu on contemporary Chinese martial arts.

Collections, Translations, and Studies

Liang, T.T., "T'ai Chi Ch'uan for Health and Self-Defense:Philosophy and Practice (New York: VIntage, 1977)
Lo, Benjamin; Inn, Martin;  Amacker, Robert;  Foe, Susan -  "The Essence of T'ai Chi Ch'uan: The Literary Tradition" (Berkeley: North Atlantic, 1979 )
Jou, Tsung-hwa, "The Tao of T'ai Chi Ch'uan" (Rutland: Tuttle, 1980)
Wile, Doug, "Tai Chi Touchstones: Yang Family Secret Transmissions" (Sweet Ch'i Press 1983)
Wile, Doug, "Lost T'ai-chi Classics from the Late Ch'ing Dynasty" (Albany: SUNY, 1996)
Davis, Barbara, "The Taijiquan Classics: An Annotated Translation" (Berkeley: North Atlantic, 2004)
Xin, Chen, "The Illustrated Canon of Chen Family Taijiquan" (Xi'an: INBI Matrix, 2007)
Yun, Zhang; Ho, David, "The Taijiquan Classics: The Essential Translation and Explanation with Commentary on History and Culture" (Lulu, 2016 )

References

Chinese martial arts
Tai chi